Time Capsule: Songs for a Future Generation is a greatest hits album by American new wave band the B-52's, released in 1998. The album presents sixteen of their single releases and fan-favorite album tracks in chronological order, with the addition of two new songs recorded exclusively for this collection.

Background 
The album includes sixteen previously released as well as two new songs, "Hallucinating Pluto" and "Debbie". The latter is a tribute to Debbie Harry of Blondie. Also exclusive to this release is the "Original Unreleased Mix" of their 1986 song "Summer of Love". 

The album cover features the five founding band members standing in front of the Unisphere.

Singer Cindy Wilson, who had been absent for several years, made her return to recording with the group on this album, and shared songwriting credits on the two new tracks. As noted in the book The B-52's Universe, the band intended this to be a larger box set consisting of singles, demos, outtakes, and new tracks, but Warner made the band condense the tracklist to a single disc.

Release
Editions released in Europe, Japan and Brazil had a different track listing to the US release. In Europe and Japan the album was shortened to 15 tracks, with "Quiche Lorraine" substituted with a live version, which previously appeared on the charity record Tame Yourself, and adding "(Meet) The Flintstones". A video compilation consisting of twelve of the band's music videos, titled Time Capsule: Videos for a Future Generation 1979–1998, was also released on VHS.

In 2009 the album was reissued in Australia based on the international edition CD, but with new changes, and packed with a DVD reissue of Time Capsule: Videos for a Future Generation 1979–1998. The CD replaced the demo version of "Summer Of Love" with the 1986 single mix and "Debbie" with "Give Me Back My Man".

Reception
The album spent 11 weeks on the U.S. Billboard album charts and reached its peak position of #93 in June 1998.

Track listing

2009 Australian reissue

Chart performance

Certifications

References

The B-52's compilation albums
1998 greatest hits albums
1998 video albums
Music video compilation albums
Albums produced by Nile Rodgers
Albums produced by Don Was
Albums produced by Rhett Davies
Albums produced by David Byrne
Albums produced by Chris Blackwell
Reprise Records compilation albums
Synth-pop compilation albums